Kordi Kola (also Romanized as Kordī Kolā) is a village in Kheyrud Kenar Rural District, in the Central District of Nowshahr County, Mazandaran Province, Iran. At the 2006 census, its population was 432, in 114 families.

References 

Populated places in Nowshahr County